Parivāra (Pāli for "accessory") is the third and last book of the Theravādin Vinaya Pitaka.  It includes a summary and multiple analyses of the various rules identified in the Vinaya Pitaka's first two books, the Suttavibhanga and the Khandhaka, primarily for didactic purposes. As it includes a long list of teachers in Ceylon, scholars, and even Theravada fundamentalists, recognize that, at least in its present form, it is of late date, some suggesting it may be even later than the Fourth Council in Ceylon in the last century BCE, at which the Pali Canon was written down from oral tradition.

Translation: The Book of the Discipline, tr I. B. Horner, volume VI, 1966, Pali Text Society, Oxford.

The book contains 19 chapters:

 catechisms on the rules of the monks' Patimokkha
 similar on the nuns' rules
 verse summary of origins; an action can be originated by body and/or speech, in each of the three cases with or without intention, making six origins in all; this chapter goes through all the Patimokkha rules for monks and nuns, saying which of these six are possible
 in two parts:
 repetitions on types of legal case involved in offences
 which rules for settling disputes are to be applied to legal cases
 questions on Khandhaka
 lists arranged numerically (cf. Anguttara Nikaya)
in two parts:
 beginning the recitation of the Patimokkha
 exposition of reasons for rules
 collection of stanzas
 on legal cases
 additional collection of stanzas (mainly on reproving)
 on reproving
 lesser collection on disputes
 greater collection on disputes
 kathina: the process of making up robes
 Upali asks the Buddha questions, the answers being lists of five
 another chapter on origins
 second (sic) collection of stanzas
 "sweat-inducing stanzas": a collection of riddles (answers not given here); perhaps intended as exam questions"
 in five parts:
 formal acts of the sangha
 reasons for rules
 laying down of rules
 what was laid down
 nine classifications

See also 
 Vinaya Pitaka

Notes

Vinaya Pitaka
Theravada Buddhist texts